The Anglican Diocese of Warri is one of 12 within the Anglican Province of Bendel, itself one of 14 provinces within the Church of Nigeria. The current bishop is Christian Esezi Ide.

John Onyaene Dafiewhare was enthroned as the first Bishop of Warri on  28 January 1980 (Dafiewhare died in 1994). Nathaniel Enuku took over the see from April 1992 until March 2003, and was followed in 2006, after a hiatus of 3 years, by Christian Esezi Ide.

Notes

Dioceses of the Province of Bendel
Church of Nigeria dioceses